Sarah Thankam Mathews is an Indian-American author, novelist, and organizer. Her debut novel, All This Could Be Different, was a finalist for the 2022 National Book Award for Fiction.

Personal life 
Mathews was born in Bangalore, India to Malayali parents. Her parents quickly moved with her to Muscat, Oman where she was raised in a tight-knit Indian enclave. She moved to the US with her family when she was 17. She currently lives in Brooklyn and considers Kerala to be her ancestral home.

Mathews began her career in progressive politics at a public-affairs firm in Washington D.C. She quit her job to pursue an MFA in writing. After receiving her MFA, she worked many freelance jobs in New York City, including in graphic design, web design, project management, freelance writing, and as a personal assistant. She lost work and income when the COVID-19 pandemic hit, causing her to go on unemployment and putting her process of becoming a naturalized US citizen at risk. It was during this time that she wrote her debut novel and began a mutual-aid organization—at the same time.

Writing career 
In 2020, Mathews was a Margins Fellow at the Asian American Writers’ Workshop and a Rona Jaffe Fellow at the Iowa Writers' Workshop. She also received The Best American Short Stories 2020 award. She worked on a novel for seven years—which she used for her MFA thesis—and ultimately put it aside. She now calls it "Novel Zero." The next novel she worked on, All This Could Be Different, became her debut novel and was published in 2022.

All This Could Be Different 
In 2022, she published her debut novel All This Could Be Different. The novel was received with critical acclaim and was a finalist in the 2022 National Book Awards. Mathews did not receive the award, which has never been won by a South Asian author.

The novel centers a South Asian queer protagonist who is navigating love, friendship, and career in Milwaukee during the Great Recession and the Obama presidency. Elements of it reflect the author's own life as a queer South Asian immigrant to the US. 

Mathews began writing the novel in the summer 2020 when she was 29 years old and surviving on unemployment benefits during the COVID-19 pandemic. She wrote it at the same time that she was launching a mutual aid organization called Bed-Stuy Strong. She completed the novel in 4 months, found an agent in November 2020, and sold it at auction.

Organizing 
During the COVID-19 pandemic, Mathews helped to create Bed-Stuy Strong, a grassroots mutual-aid organization that raised $1.2 million to serve its Brooklyn-based community. She came up with the idea when talking with her neighbor, a native of Bedford-Stuyvesant while COVID-19 cases and quarantines were just beginning to spike in the US. She began organizing by creating a Slack network which she marketed through neighborhood flyers.

The organization ultimately helped 28,000 people living in Brooklyn who were suffering from food crisis during the pandemic. The organization's primary aid service was grocery delivery.

Published works 

 (2018) The Love Song of G. Madhvi Suresh. Platypus Press Shorts.
 (2022) All This Could Be Different. New York: Viking. ISBN 978-0-593-48912-3

References 

Indian expatriates in the United States
21st-century Indian women writers
Date of birth missing (living people)
Living people
21st-century Indian novelists
English-language writers from India
Indian romantic fiction writers
Indian women novelists
21st-century American novelists
American women writers of Indian descent
American women novelists
American romantic fiction novelists